Tsholofelo is the debut studio album by South African hip hop recording artist Cassper Nyovest, released digitally via iTunes on 18 July 2014 and physically released on 31 July 2014 under a distribution deal with AMG Worldmedia owned by Lindsay Jerome Arends, a former & founding member of the R&B group Ashaan.

Tsholofelo, which means "hope", is named after his younger sister. Work on the album began as early as 2011 and continued on through 2014. It features guest appearances from HHP, Okmalumkoolkat, Bucie, iFANi, Riky Rick, Bass Mdlongwa, Ntukza, Kyle Deutschmann, Tshego, Anatii, Skales (credited as Young Skalez), KayGizm from Morafe and Prokid. Prior to its release, the album was supported by three free singles: "Gusheshe", "Doc Shebeleza" and "Phumakim", all of which achieved wide mainstream appeal.

Background, recording and release
The idea to name the album after Nyovest's younger sister came after she gave Cassper her allowance for him to relocate to Johannesburg with: "At the time, I had just quit everything and I didn’t have the money to travel and come to Jo'burg to hustle. Ever since that day it has always been about making sure that her sacrifice was not in vain." In September 2013, Nyovest mentioned that the album was 90% percent done: "I’ve recorded a lot of music, now I just need to conceptualize the story of the album. There’s so much music because I’m currently sitting on like 300 songs, so I don’t even know what to do." He also mentioned that guest appearances on the album would include Okmalumkoolkat, Masterkraft, Kaygizm, Shag, PRO, Kyle Deutschmann, Skales, Riky Rick, iFani and HHP. In March 2014 a track list of the album was leaked online. Nyovest would later state that the album contained 19 songs and not 16 as shown by the track list. On 10 June 2014, he revealed the cover for the album, along with the release date. On Mandela Day, Nyovest released the album exclusively on iTunes without prior announcement. Within an hour of its debut, Tsholofelo peaked at number 1 on the iTunes South Africa albums chart.

Promotion
In support of the album, many promotional singles were released including "#BMK" and "Wahala" featuring Young Slugz. Both songs were produced by Ganja Beatz and accompanied by music videos. On Valentine's day, 2013, Nyovest released a track titled "Girlfriend" as part of the "TruSSt Thursdays" series. The song features and is produced by Riky Rick. Nyovest also did a string of radio interviews and performances to promote the album. On 2 July 2014, he performed an unreleased song on Metro FM titled, "Alive" which features Durban based vocalist and Idols SA season 10 top 11 finalist Kyle Deutschmann.

Album artwork
The artwork was revealed via Twitter and Facebook by Nyovest on 10 June 2014. The cover, which was designed by Freshboi, is an illustration of Nyovest's portrait.

Singles
In April 2013, the album's lead single "Gusheshe" was released. It features Dirty Paraffin's Okmalumkoolkat.

The second single, "Doc Shebeleza", produced by Sean Craig Beats, was released on 17 January 2014 for free digital downloads. Its music video was directed by Nicky Campos and Nyovest. It has a total runtime of 4 minutes and 2 seconds. The song debuted at number 4 on South Africa's official music chart.

"Phumakim", the album's third single, was released on 3 July 2014 with production from Zimbabwean producer, Brian Soko, who co-produced Drunk in Love by Beyoncé. "Phumakim" which is in Zulu, loosely translates to "Leave me alone". In the song, Nyovest addresses the criticism that celebrities receive on social media and makes a reference to his highly publicized feud with rapper AKA. He also raps about how he only dates women as famous as him. The beat for Phumakim was originally meant for American rapper, Future, who declined it.
"Phumakim" garnered 15,000 downloads within its first minute of release and trended on Twitter in South Africa and in the UK.

"Tsibip", the album's promotional single, was released in August 2014. Two videos were shot for the song to showcase Cassper Nyovest's different alter-egos, "Cassper" and "Nyovest". Both of the videos were shot by Studio Space Pictures. The first video premiered on MTV Base's "Spanking New Premiere". It is a one-take video which shows Nyovest bare chest wearing a wrist watch, a ring and a gold chain around his neck. For the duration of the video, Nyovest tries on and exchanges different caps up until he puts on the cap he is depicted wearing on the Tsholofelo album cover. The second video premiered on Channel O's "Turn Up" on the same day.

Commercial performance
In April 2015, the album was certified Platinum  by the Recording Industry of South Africa, selling over 40,000 copies. To celebrate this, Nyovest released a platinum edition of the album which features new material and old songs which never made the final track list of Tsholofelo.

Critical reception

Upon its release, Tsholofelo received generally positive reviews. Tsepang Tlhapane of Live Mag felt the pitfall of the album was its lengthiness and its production. However, he praised the album's intro, calling it "heartfelt" and commended its drum arrangement. He also praised "Tsibip" for its witty punchlines and "Skeptedaba" for embodying elements of 90s Kwaito music.

Andy Petersen of PLATFORM gave the album a score of 82/100 adding: "This is an artist in motion - one unafraid to exhibit his growth. Tsholofelo is certainly not a perfect album, but it is a very good one. And it hints strongly of someone who is only going to get better."

Track listing

Standard edition

Tsholofelo (platinum edition) track list 

Notes
 signifies a co-producer

 signifies an additional producer

Personnel
Credits for Tsholofelo adapted from AllMusic.

Anatii – primary artist
Base – primary artist
Mzondeleli Boltina – composer
Bucie – primary artist
Kgaugelo Goodchild Choabi – composer
Kyle Deutschmann – composer, primary artist
Aashish Gangaram – composer
HHP – primary artist
iFani – primary artist
Kaygizm – primary artist
Khumoetsile Tshegofatso Koobetseng – composer
Rikhado Makhado – composer
MasterKraft – composer, primary artist
Bass Q Mdlongwa – composer
Linda Mkhize – composer
Anathi Mnyango – composer
Busisiwe Nolubabalo – composer
Ntukza – primary artist
Cassper Nyovest – primary artist
Okmalumkoolkat – primary artist
R.M. Phoolo – composer
Tsholofelo Phoolo – composer
Pro – primary artist
Obakeng Ramahali – composer
Riky Rick – primary artist
Jabulani Tsambo – composer
Tshego – primary artist
Uhuru – primary artist
Young Skalez – composer, primary artist
Smiso Zwane – composer
Brian Essence - composer

Certification and sales

Release history

References

2014 debut albums
Cassper Nyovest albums
Albums produced by Masterkraft (producer)
Albums produced by Uhuru (record producer)
Family Tree Records albums
Kalawa Jazmee Records albums